Pierre Francois Mazille (22 October 1921 – 21 March 1979) was a French racewalker. He competed in the men's 50 kilometres walk at the 1948 Summer Olympics.

References

1921 births
1979 deaths
Athletes (track and field) at the 1948 Summer Olympics
French male racewalkers
Olympic athletes of France